Hazer Tarkhan was a general (tarkhan is both a military rank and, in some cases, a personal name) who led a Khazar army of 40,000 men in the failed defense of Atil in 737 CE. He was ambushed and killed by Kawthar, the lieutenant of Marwan ibn Muhammad (later Caliph Marwan II). Following his death the Khazars sued for peace.

References
Peter B. Golden. Khazar Studies: An Historico-Philological Inquiry into the Origins of the Khazars. Vol. 1. Budapest: Akadémiai Kiadó, 1980.

Year of birth missing
Khazar generals
737 deaths
People of the Arab–Khazar wars
Military personnel killed in action